Prince Yongsan (Hangul: 용산원자, Hanja: 龍山元子, ; 1325–1341) was a Goryeo Royal Prince and the heir successor to the throne as the only son of King Chungsuk of Goryeo and Princess Joguk. However, his mother died at 17 years old not long after he was born. 

According to Goryeosa records written by Jeong Bang-gil (정방길) in 1330, it was said that the Prince didn't have a good relationship with his half older brother, the 16 years old Prince Wang Jeong who was 10 years older than Yongsan. Then, Bang-gil told Wang Jeong who wanted go to Yuan dynasty for join with Prince Yongsan to go there, but Jo Ik-cheong (조익청) said "It's Impossible" (불가하다) and he then stopped it. Meanwhile, considering that Yongsan was in Yuan until his death, it is highly probable that he went to the Yuan dynasty between 1330 and 1341 and died in there during his stay. After his death, his body was transported to Goryeo for the funeral, but his tomb site was unknown because no records left about that.

Ancestry

References

Korean princes
1325 births
1341 deaths
14th-century Korean people
People from Seoul